Girls' School is a 1938 drama film starring Anne Shirley. The film was directed by John Brahm and based upon a Tess Slesinger story. Morris Stoloff and Gregory Stone were nominated for the Academy Award for Best Music, Scoring.

Plot
The film revolves around wealthy high school teenagers who are sent to Magnolia Hall, a boarding school to learn proper etiquette. One of the girls causes a scandal when she stays out all night, then announces on planning to elope with a boy. She gets in trouble when the faculty finds out through a monitor's report from a reluctant poor girl attending on scholarship.

Cast
Anne Shirley - Natalie Freeman
Ralph Bellamy - Michael Hendragin
Nan Grey - Linda Simpson
Dorothy Moore - Betty Fleet
Gloria Holden - Miss Laurel
Marjorie Main - Miss Honore Armstrong
Cecil Cunningham - Miss Brewster, Dean of Students
Doris Kenyon - Mrs. Howard
Margaret Tallichet - Gwennie
Peggy Moran - Myra

References

External links 
 

1938 films
American black-and-white films
1930s teen comedy films
American teen comedy films
Columbia Pictures films
Films directed by John Brahm
Films scored by Morris Stoloff
Films set in schools
Films set in boarding schools
1938 comedy films
1930s American films